Two vessels of the United States Navy have been named USS Katahdin, after Mount Katahdin.

, was a screw gunboat commissioned in early 1862, active throughout the American Civil War, and decommissioned shortly after war's end
, was an ironclad ram in service from 1897 to 1909

United States Navy ship names